Philippe-Laurent Roland (13 August 1746 – 11 July 1816) was a French sculptor.  A native of Pont-à-Marcq, Nord, he died in Paris.  His art is neoclassical in style; he worked a great deal in stone and in terra cotta.  Some of his reliefs may be seen on the facade of the Louvre.

Biography 
The son of a tailor and innkeeper, Philippe-Laurent Roland began his training at the drawing school in Lille, in his native region. He had a younger brother, the painter Jacques-François-Joseph Roland (1757-1804).

In 1764, he left for Paris and joined the studio of Augustin Pajou with whom he maintained a collaboration of nearly forty years. He then collaborated with him on the decoration of the Palace of Versailles and the Palais-Royal.

Works

External links

Philippe-Laurent Roland @ ArtCyclopedia
 

1746 births
1816 deaths
People from Nord (French department)
18th-century French sculptors
French male sculptors
19th-century French sculptors
Burials at Père Lachaise Cemetery
19th-century French male artists
18th-century French male artists